Corrado Rustici (born 1957) is an Italian musician, songwriter and producer.

Recording career
Rustici was a founder member of the Naples-based progressive rock group Cervello. The band recorded the album Melos in 1973, with Rustici on guitar and vocals. In 1975, he joined with members of Osanna, including his brother Danilo, to form the group Nova. In 1976, they recorded the album Blink. For the next two albums Vimana (1976) and Wings of Love (1977), they relocated to London and worked with prominent members of the progressive rock and jazz fusion scenes, including Narada Michael Walden and Phil Collins. Nova's final album, Sun City (1978) was recorded in New York. After the disbandment of Nova, Rustici moved to Los Angeles and started a successful career as a producer and musician collaborating with many artists both in the United States and Italy. These have included Whitney Houston, Aretha Franklin, Zucchero and Elisa.

In 1995, Rustici released his first solo album, The Heartist. His 2006 album, Deconstruction of a Postmodern Musician, features guest artists such as Elisa and Allan Holdsworth. To promote the album Rustici formed the Corrado Rustici Trio with former Jethro Tull keyboardist Peter-John Vettese and jazz fusion drummer Steve Smith. In 2014, the band recorded a live album Blaze and Bloom - Live in Japan. In 2017, Rustici performed at a reunion concert in Tokyo with other original members of Cervello, later to be released as a live CD and DVD titled Cervello - Live in Tokyo 2017.

Discography

Solo albums
1995: The Heartist
2006: Deconstruction of a Postmodern Musician
2014: Blaze and Bloom - Live in Japan
2016: Aham
2021: Interfulgent

With Cervello
1973: Melos
2019: Cervello - Live in Tokyo 2017

With Nova
1975: Blink
1976: Vimana
1977: Wings of Love
1978: Sun City

With other artists
Claudio Baglioni
1999: Viaggiatore sulla coda del tempo

John G. Perry
1976: Sunset Wading
1977: Seabird

Narada Michael Walden
1979: The Dance of Life
1980: Victory
1982: Confidence
1983: Looking at You, Looking at Me
1985: The Nature of Things
1988: Divine Emotion

Herbie Hancock 
1982: Lite Me Up

Whitney Houston
1985: Whitney Houston
1987: Whitney

Aretha Franklin
1985: Who's Zoomin' Who?
1986: Aretha

George Benson
1986: While the City Sleeps...

Larry Graham
1985: Fired Up

Enzo Avitabile
1991: Enzo Avitabile

Sister Sledge
1981: All American Girls

Elton John
1994: True Love

Jefferson Starship
1987: No Protection

Al Jarreau
1992: Heaven and Earth

Dionne Warwick
1985: Friends

Clarence Clemons
1985: Hero

Zucchero Fornaciari
1985: Zucchero & The Randy Jackson Band
1986: Rispetto
1987: Blue's
1989: Oro Incenso & Birra
1992: Miserere
1995: Spirito DiVino
1998: BlueSugar
2001: Shake

I Muvrini
1998: Leia

Francesco De Gregori
1996: Prendere e lasciare

Elisa
1997: Pipes & Flowers
2001: Luce (tramonti a nord est)
2001: Then Comes the Sun
2006: Soundtrack '96-'06
2007: Caterpillar

Andrea Bocelli
2004: Andrea

Negramaro
2004: Negramaro
2005: Mentre tutto scorre
2007: La finestra

Ameba4
2006: ameba4

Romeus
2010: Romeus

Luciano Ligabue
2007: Niente paura
2007: Buonanotte all'Italia
2008: Il centro del mondo
2010: Arrivederci, mostro!
2011: Campovolo 2.011

Giusy Ferreri
2011: Il mare immenso
2011: Deja vù

Noemi
2011: RossoNoemi
2011: Odio tutti i cantanti
2011: Poi inventi il modo
2012: Sono solo parole
2012: In un giorno qualunque

Cristiano De André
2013: Come in cielo così in guerra

Tazenda
1995: Fortza Paris

Pino Daniele
2013: Resta quel che resta

Rita
2000: Time For Peace

References

External links

1957 births
Italian guitarists
Italian male singer-songwriters
Italian singer-songwriters
Italian pop musicians
Italian record producers
Jazz fusion guitarists
Musicians from Naples
Living people